Mohammed Rabee  (born May 10, 1982) is a Saudi football player who plays a goalkeeper .

References

1982 births
Living people
Saudi Arabian footballers
Al-Hazem F.C. players
Abha Club players
Al-Orobah FC players
Al-Shoulla FC players
Place of birth missing (living people)
Saudi First Division League players
Saudi Professional League players
Association football goalkeepers